Dame Alice Harpur School (also known as DAHS), known from 1882 until 1946 as Bedford Girls' Modern School, was a private girls school in Bedford, England, for girls aged 7–18. In September 2010 the junior department of the school merged with the junior department of Bedford High School. From September 2011 to September 2012 the senior schools also merged; the new school is known as Bedford Girls' School.

Bedford Girls' Modern School, 1882 to 1946
The school was established in 1882 as the Bedford Girls' Modern School, at the same time and on the same site as the Bedford High School for girls, both of which were part of the Harpur Trust group of independent schools which also included the boys' schools Bedford School and Bedford Modern School. At first, it shared its premises with Bedford High School, until in 1892 it moved to St Paul's Square, occupying the William Cowper building left vacant by the Grammar School, with Mary Eliza Porter as headmistress until her resignation in 1894. Initially, the Girls' Modern School was much less successful in attracting girls than the more traditional High School, and in 1894 the number of pupils at the two was 146 and 553 respectively. However, under a new head mistress, Edith Dolby (1894 to 1925), the school began to find its way. The curriculum was expanded, the girls stayed longer, and by 1908 numbers had reached 312.

In 1938, having outgrown its St Paul's Square site, the school moved to new buildings designed by Oswald Milne on the southern bank of the Great Ouse on Cardington Road, Bedford, built on playing fields there already owned by the Harpur Trust and used by the school.

Dame Alice Harpur School, 1946 to 2011
In 1946, the school changed its name to Dame Alice Harpur School, adopting the name of the wife of Sir William Harpur, who had originally endowed his foundation with land in Bedford and Holborn, London.

The school always had a Christian ethos, upholding traditional values and standards, but it was fundamentally ecumenical. Girls were divided into one of four houses representing famous figures from historic Bedford, these were Bunyan (Green), Harpur (Yellow), Howard (Blue) and Russell (Red).

After the move of 1938, the senior school had modern buildings, plus agreeable gardens and playing fields, on a riverside site. It was well equipped for sport, with a floodlit all-weather pitch, tennis courts, netball courts, hockey fields, indoor swimming pool, sports hall, gymnasium, sports pavilion, and a boathouse on the River Great Ouse. There were also facilities for design technology, textiles, art, and drama; two listed Georgian houses were adapted to provide a sixth-form centre, Chequers cafe and music centre. In 2006 a new Sixth Form centre was created and was opened by Gail Emms, an Olympic silver medalist who was an old girl of the school.

The school offered a broad general education and examination results were extremely good, with a 100% GCSE pass rate in 2003. Drama was very strong and the music department was especially flourishing (with choirs, orchestras, string quartets, a string orchestra, wind band, and other ensembles). A wide range of sports and games were provided; many teams competed at county and regional level, and some regularly at national level. Extra-curricular activities included the Duke of Edinburgh Award Scheme, Combined Cadet Force, debating, Youth Theatre, chess, field courses and a wide range of outdoor activities and visits.

The last school uniform for senior school girls from ages eleven to sixteen consisted of a pleated skirt in navy blue, a navy blue v-neck jumper with a blue eagle representative of the Harpur Trust embroidered on the chest, a pale blue shirt, and a navy blue blazer with an embroidered school shield containing a cornflower, an eagle and a book. For the winter, it was optional for the girls to wear the school's formal long winter coat in place of the school blazer, but it had to be worn to the Christmas carol service. The uniform in years 12 and 13 consisted of a navy blue skirt, white blouse, plain V-neck navy blue jumper combined with black pumps or low heels.

In 2012 the Dame Alice Harpur school was listed by The Independent newspaper in the top ten independent schools in England, and it won numerous awards for both academic and extra-curricular achievement.

Jill Berry, head of Dame Alice Harpur School from 2000 to 2010, was the President of the Girls' Schools Association in 2009.

Merger
In July 2009, the Harpur Trust announced its intention to merge Dame Alice Harpur School with Bedford High School. The decision was made as both schools had seen a drop in pupil numbers over the years: In 1990 more than 2,000 girls were on the rolls of both schools, whilst in 2009 there were only 1,500. In November 2009, it was announced that the new merged school would be called Bedford Girls' School, and would be located on the campus of Dame Alice Harpur School at Cardington Road. The junior department of the new school opened in September 2010, when the junior schools of Bedford High and Dame Alice Harpur merged on the Cardington Road site. The senior department of Dame Alice Harpur School started to transfer to the new school administration in September 2011, with the full merger, including the sixth form department completed in September 2012.

Head Mistresses

Bedford Girls’ Modern School
 1882–1894: Mary Eliza Porter (died 1905)
 1894–1925: Edith Emily Dolby, BA (Cantab.) (1863–1947)
 1925–1939: Beatrice Alice Tonkin MA (Cantab.) (1884–1953)

Dame Alice Harpur School
 1946–1955: Irene Forster BSc
 1955–1970: Hilda Lawson-Brown
 1970–1990: Suzanne Morse
 1990–2000: Rosanne Randle BA MA (Ed)
 2000–2010: Jill Berry BA MEd
 2010–2011: Jo Mackenzie

Notable former pupils

 Sue Beardsmore, BBC television presenter
 Louise Brealey, actress and journalist
 Gail Emms, Olympic badminton silver medalist
 Lucie Green, astrophysicist
 Claudia Hammond, author and BBC radio presenter
 Kirsty Hayes, British Ambassador to Portugal
 Jean Muir CBE FCSD, fashion designer
 Kim Pearce, Theatre Director
 Anna Ploszajski, Young Engineer of the Year by the Royal Academy of Engineering
 Liz Stout, journalist and PR consultant.
 Sarah Abbott MW, Master of Wine

Bursars
 1991–2005: Stewart Frater
 2005–2011: Jean-Marc Hodgkin, BSc, FCA, FSI, ACIS, DChA

See also
 List of independent schools in the United Kingdom

References

Further reading
Constance M. Broadway and Esther I. Buss, The History of the School 1882 B.G.M.S. - D.A.H.S. 1982 (Bedford, 1982, 191 pp.)

External links
 Dame Alice Harpur School website
 Independent Schools Inspectorate Report 2004

Defunct schools in the Borough of Bedford
Girls' schools in Bedfordshire
Educational institutions established in 1882
Educational institutions disestablished in 2012
1882 establishments in England
2012 disestablishments in England